Captain Harry Gosford Reeves (30 September 1896 – 24 January 1918) was a British World War I flying ace credited with 13 aerial victories while flying various models of Nieuport aircraft. He was killed in a crash while flight testing a Nieuport 27.

Biography
Reeves was born in Staines, Middlesex, and educated at St. John's College, Hurstpierpoint, Sussex.

He joined the Royal Flying Corps in early 1917 as a temporary second lieutenant (on probation), and was appointed a flying officer on 19 May. Reeves was then posted to No. 1 Squadron, flying a Nieuport 23, where he quickly began to gain success in the air, accounting for two enemy aircraft in June, one in July and three in August. Another three victories come in September, and he celebrated being appointed a flight commander with the temporary rank of captain on 9 October 1917, by accounting for another enemy aircraft, bringing his total to eight. He then flew a Nieuport 27, gaining five more victories, the last being on 18 November 1917.

On 24 January 1918 Reeves was flight testing a new aircraft behind the British lines in France, when it crashed and he was killed. He is buried in the Communal Cemetery Extension, Bailleul, Nord, France.

List of aerial victories

See also
 Aerial victory standards of World War I
 List of World War I aces credited with 11–14 victories

References

1896 births
1918 deaths
People from Staines-upon-Thames
People educated at Hurstpierpoint College
Royal Flying Corps officers
Military personnel from Middlesex
British World War I flying aces
British military personnel killed in World War I
Aviators killed in aviation accidents or incidents in France